The San Martín River is a tributary of the main stem Ameca River, which drains into the Bahía de Banderas of the Pacific Ocean, near Puerto Vallarta, Jalisco. The river derives its name from the city of San Martín de Hidalgo, the largest town it flows through. It is fed from various smaller tributaries which rise from the Mesa de Ramos in the west and the Sierra de Quila in the south.

See also
Arroyo Las Minas, one of its main tributaries.

References

Rivers of Jalisco